Midlothian Heritage High School is a comprehensive public high school in Midlothian, Texas, and a part of the Midlothian Independent School District.

The school opened in 2014. The first 12th grade class graduated in 2017.

References

External links
 Midlothian Heritage High School

Public high schools in Texas
Schools in Ellis County, Texas
2014 establishments in Texas
Educational institutions established in 2014